Journal of Intelligent Material Systems and Structures is a peer-reviewed academic journal that publishes papers in the field of Materials Science. The journal's editors are Daniel J. Inman University of Michigan and N. M. Wereley University of Maryland. It has been in publication since 1990 and is currently published by SAGE Publications.

Scope 
Journal of Intelligent Materials Systems and Structures is an international journal that publishes original research, reports and results of theoretical work in the field of materials science. The journal focuses on work based any aspect of intelligent materials systems and/or structures research, smart materials, active materials, adaptive structures and adaptive materials.

Abstracting and indexing 
Journal of Intelligent Material Systems and Structures  is abstracted and indexed in, among other databases:  SCOPUS, and the Social Sciences Citation Index. According to the Journal Citation Reports, its 2013 impact factor is 2.172, ranking it 68 out of 251 journals in the category ‘Materials Science, Multidisciplinary’.

References

External links 
 

SAGE Publishing academic journals
English-language journals
Publications established in 1990
Journals published between 13 and 25 times per year